Petero Benjamin "Ben" Nakubuwai (born 15 March 1996) is a Fiji international rugby league footballer who plays as a  for the Leigh Leopards in the Betfred Super League.
 
Nakubuwai previously played for the Gold Coast Titans in the National Rugby League and the Salford Red Devils in the Super League, and was a member of Fiji's squad for the 2017 World Cup.

Background
Nakubuwai was born in Leeton, New South Wales, Australia to Fijian parents Pio and Eseta. His father was a dual-code rugby international for Fiji during the 1990s, and is known as one of the pioneers of rugby league in Fiji.

Nakubuwai grew up playing rugby union from the age of eight for the Leeton Phantoms, and later took up rugby league at a junior level at age fourteen, playing for the Yanco-Wamoon Hawks and Bidgee Hurricanes. Having been spotted by the Melbourne Storm, Nakubwai moved to Melbourne after completing his Higher School Certificate to play in their S. G. Ball Cup team.

Playing career

Early career
Nakubuwai joined Melbourne's National Youth Competition team in 2015, playing 42 matches over two seasons. He made his international debut for Fiji against Papua New Guinea in May 2016. In December 2016, Nakubuwai signed with the Gold Coast Titans.

2017
Nakubuwai spent most of the 2017 season playing for one of the Titans' feeder clubs, the Tweed Heads Seagulls, in the Queensland Cup. He was called upon to play two NRL matches for the Titans at the end of the season.

On 29 November 2017, it was revealed Nakubuwai had signed a two-year deal to join English side Salford Red Devils in the Super League.

2022
On 26 April 2022 it was announced that Nakubuwai had signed for Leigh until the end of the season.  On 28 May 2022, he played for Leigh in their 2022 RFL 1895 Cup final victory over Featherstone.

References

External links
Salford Red Devils profile
NRL profile
Melbourne Storm profile
2017 RLWC profile
SL profile
Fiji profile

1996 births
Living people
Australian rugby league players
Australian people of Fijian descent
Australian expatriate sportspeople in England
Fiji national rugby league team players
Gold Coast Titans players
Leigh Leopards players
Norths Devils players
Rugby league props
Rugby league players from New South Wales
Salford Red Devils players